Kalin is a surname. Notable people with the surname include:

 Jacqui Kalin (born 1989), American-Israeli professional basketball player
 Tom Kalin (born 1962), award-winning screenwriter, film director and producer.
 Boris Kalin (1905–1975), Slovene sculptor
 Andrea Kalin, documentary director, producer and the founder and executive producer of Spark Media
 Frank Kalin (1917–1975), Major League Baseball outfielder
 Jeremy Kalin (born 1975), Minnesota politician and a member of the Minnesota House of Representatives
 Yngve Kalin (born 1950), Swedish priest and one of the leaders of the traditionalist movement in the Church of Sweden
 The Kalin Twins, recording duo who had 1958 hit "When"

See also

Kali (name)